Saral Lake is located on border of Neelam and Kaghan Valley in Pakistan at an altitude of . The lake is accessible from Sharda by a jeepable track which leads to Gumot National Park and then through hiking trek can be reached to the lake.

See also
Chitta Katha Lake
Ratti Gali Lake
List of lakes of Pakistan

References

Lakes of Azad Kashmir
Glacial lakes